Lene Brøndum (born 26 June 1947) is a Danish actress. At the 23rd Guldbagge Awards she won the award for Best Actress for her role in Hip Hip Hurrah! She has appeared in more than 35 films and television shows since 1976.

Selected filmography
 The Olsen Gang Sees Red (1976)
 Winterborn (1978)
 Hip Hip Hurrah! (1987)

References

External links

1947 births
Living people
20th-century Danish actresses
21st-century Danish actresses
Danish film actresses
Danish television actresses
Place of birth missing (living people)